San Francesco da Paola is a renaissance-style, former Roman Catholic church located in the town of Oria, province of Brindisi, Apulia, Italy.

History
The church and convent was erected in 1580 atop a sacellum or burial crypt for San Barsanofio, patron saint of the city, which sheltered his relics from 890 to 1170.

References

Churches in the province of Brindisi
16th-century Roman Catholic church buildings in Italy
Roman Catholic churches completed in 1580